Mark Howkins (born 17 June 1953) is a Canadian sports shooter. He competed at the 1984 Summer Olympics and the 1988 Summer Olympics.

References

External links
 

1953 births
Living people
Canadian male sport shooters
Olympic shooters of Canada
Shooters at the 1984 Summer Olympics
Shooters at the 1988 Summer Olympics
Sportspeople from Brisbane
Commonwealth Games medallists in shooting
Commonwealth Games silver medallists for Canada
Commonwealth Games bronze medallists for Canada
Shooters at the 1986 Commonwealth Games
Shooters at the 1990 Commonwealth Games
Medallists at the 1986 Commonwealth Games
Medallists at the 1990 Commonwealth Games